Michael John Hatton (born 28 August 1951, Sydney) is a former Australian politician who served as the Australian Labor Party member of the House of Representatives from June 1996 to October 2007, representing the Division of Blaxland, New South Wales.

Background and career
He was educated at the University of New South Wales. He was a school teacher before entering politics. From 1985 to 1996, he was an electorate officer for his predecessor as MP for Blaxland, Paul Keating (Prime Minister 1991–1996).  He entered parliament at a by-election necessitated by Keating's resignation from parliament after he lost the 1996 election to John Howard.

In May 2007 he lost party preselection and retired at the 2007 federal election which had seen his party return to power. This meant that the entirety of his parliamentary career equated to the entirety of his party's time in Opposition.

Some of Hatton interests included technology and computers where he was a champion of introducing more IT into Australian schools and greater access to Internet; he worked on whitepapers which ultimately convinced Keating to implement the NBN. Hatton was the NBN's earliest advocate. Keating was the first person to call on National Broadband Network to be built on fibre optics; and equity and access to internet for disadvantaged.

References

1951 births
Living people
Australian Labor Party members of the Parliament of Australia
Labor Right politicians
Members of the Australian House of Representatives for Blaxland
Politicians from Sydney
University of New South Wales alumni
21st-century Australian politicians
20th-century Australian politicians
Australian schoolteachers